Ban Phai is a district (amphoe) of Khon Kaen province, northeastern Thailand.

Geography
Neighboring districts are (from the south clockwise): Pueai Noi, Nong Song Hong, Non Sila, Chonnabot, Mancha Khiri, and Ban Haet of Khon Kaen Province; Kosum Phisai and Kut Rang of Maha Sarakham province.

History
Originally named Ban Keng (บ้านเกิ้ง), the area was at first a subdistrict (tambon) of Chonnabot district. In 1928 the minor district (king amphoe) Ban Phai was established consisting of three subdistricts split off from Chonnabot. It was upgraded to a full district on 1 February 1940. In 1946 Chonnabot was downgraded to be a part of Ban Phai District, until it was reestablished in 1966.

Economy
, Thai sugar giant, the Mitr Phol Group, plans to construct a sugarcane mill and biomass power plant in the district. The initiative will occupy  of three of the province's neighbouring districts: Ban Phai, Chonnabot, and Non Sila. The operation will form part of the Ban Phai Bio-Hub Industrial Estate and is linked to the Eastern Economic Corridor (EEC) project. Mitr Phol's plans have been met with some opposition from local residents. Mitr Phol has pledged that the factory will have no adverse environmental effects.

Administration
The district is divided into 10 subdistricts (tambons), which are further subdivided into 113 villages (mubans). Ban Phai is a town (thesaban mueang) which covers parts of tambons Ban Phai, Khaen Nuea, and Nai Mueang. There are a further 10 tambon administrative organizations (TAO).

Missing numbers are subdistricts which now form Ban Haet and Non Sila Districts.

References

External links
amphoe.com (Thai)

Ban Phai